Lkhamsurengiin Myagmarsuren (born February 17, 1938) is a Mongolian chess master.

He won the West Asian zonal tournament in 1966. and tied for 19-20th place in the Interzonal tournament in Sousse, Tunisia 1967 (Bent Larsen won).

In other international tournaments, he tied for 5-6th place at Dushanbe 1962 (Leonid Shamkovich won); won 12th place at Havana 1967 (4th Armies-ch, Vlastimil Hort won); took 16th place at Tallinn 1971 (Paul Keres and Mikhail Tal won);, and tied for 8-9th place in the 10th Rubinstein Memorial at Polanica Zdrój 1972 (Jan Smejkal won).

Myagmarsuren was a four-time Mongolian chess champion (1965, 1980, 1981, 1982). He played ten times for Mongolia in the Chess Olympiads (1960–1974 and 1980–1982), where he won an individual gold medal at the fourth board (+14 –1 =5) at Leipzig 1960.

Myagmarsuren was awarded the IM title in 1966. His handle on the Internet Chess Club is "Shatar".

References

External links

Lhamsuren Myagmarsuren at 365Chess.com

1938 births
Living people
Mongolian chess players
Chess International Masters
Chess Olympiad competitors